The  Hebrew University Business School, is the business school of The Hebrew University and based in Mt. Scopus. Founded in 1952 by Daniel and Raphael Recanati, The Jerusalem School of Business Administration is consistently rated as one of the top business schools in the country, for programs instructed in both Hebrew and English.

Since its establishment at the Hebrew University of Jerusalem, the School's goal has been to develop the next generation of business leaders and push the envelope of knowledge in the field of business management.
 
The Jerusalem School of Business Administration awards undergraduate degrees in the disciplines of Business Administration, Accounting, and East Asian Studies, and offer Master of Business Administration degrees at the postgraduate level. Additionally, they have programs which offer a BioMed MBA and International StartUp MBA in English.

Since 2020, Professor Nicole Adler has served as Dean. Notable faculty members include Zvi Wiener, Haim Levi, Eugene Kandel, Dan Galai, Renana Peres, Orly Sade, and Gur Mosheiov.

History 
The Jerusalem School of Business Administration was founded in 1952, as a department in the Social Science Faculty. The school was the first academic institute in Israel to provide academic and professional training for managers.
 
During the first years, the school offered graduate-level courses of business administration. Over time, the fields of expertise broaden which allowed for the expansion of faculty members.

Today, the school consists of 29 faculty members who represent the diverse fields of research: finance and banking, organizational behavior, human resource management, marketing, internet research, strategy and managerial entrepreneurship and operational research.

The school was established as an autonomic entity due to the consistent work of Avraham Meshulach. In the history of Israel academics, the Jerusalem School of Business Administration was the first to appoint a woman as a professor in finance, Professor Orly Sade.

Programs
The more than 2,000 students in the School must meet stiff entrance requirements. Our alumni are innovative and creative executives with a global orientation, capable of analyzing complex problems in real time and making and implementing decisions under difficult conditions. Proof of this is the high demand for our graduates in the labor market.

The School offers a wide variety of study tracks:

B.A. in Business Administration
B.A. in Accounting
Fourth-year program in accounting
Special B.A. programs for outstanding students
MBA programs
Executive MBA programs
Doctoral studies
The School of Business Administration maintains wide-ranging mutual relationships with leading academic and business institutions all over the world. The study programs offer student-exchange frameworks, international conferences in Israel and abroad and direct exposure to the modern business environment.

The faculty members at the School are first-rank academics and professionals, who received their academic training at the world's finest universities. The lecturers are at the forefront of knowledge in their fields and teach material that is parallel to that studied in the most prestigious academic institutions in the world.

Post Graduate Studies
MBA Program

The School of Business Administration's flagship MBA program equips students with a cross-functional skill set to analyze, synthesize and utilize "big picture” thinking to meet the demands of a competitive and increasingly complex business world. MBA degrees are offered in the following disciplines:
Finance and Banking
Marketing
Organizational Behavior and Human Resource Management
Internet Studies (Data Science)
Strategy and Managerial Entrepreneurship
Operations Research and Management
Big Data Analytics
Bio-Medical Management
International StartUp
Real Estate Finance
Supply Chain Management

Doctoral Program

There is also a doctoral program, which numbers around 30 students doing research in a wide variety of fields. There is an option to earn an interdisciplinary degree through a combined study program that includes advisers from other academic fields.

Research and Teaching
The school aims to educate Israel's next generation of business leaders. As part of this cause, the school offers a variety of academic programs: B.A. in Business Administration, B.A. in Accounting, complementary year for Accounting students, special programs for excellent students, MBA, Executive MBA and Ph.D.

The School of Business Administration maintains numerous mutual relationships with leading academic and business institutions all over the world. The study programs offer student-exchange frameworks, international conferences in Israel and abroad and direct exposure to the modern business environment.

At the Jerusalem School of Business Administration, study more than 2,000 undergraduate and graduate students, 50 Executive MBA Program attendees and 30 Ph.D. students.

Ranking 
The School has won broad international recognition and is the top Israeli institution in international rankings of academic business schools. The school was ranked No. 44 in the Shanghai Academic Ranking of World Universities by Subject Fields, coming ahead of all the leading European universities other than those in England.

According to the Global 2000 List by the Center for World University Rankings (CWUR), the Hebrew University was ranked number 64 in the world and first in Israel.

Deans 
 1998-2005 Jonathan Kornbluth 
 2005-2009 Tsvi Piran
 2009-2013 Dan Galai
 2013-2016 Yishay Yafeh
 2016-2020 Zvi Wiener
 2020–Present Nicole Adler

References

External links 
 
 Alumni website
 Asper Center

Business schools
Hebrew University of Jerusalem